Ozola is a genus of moths in the family Geometridae first described by Francis Walker in 1861.

Description
Palpi porrect (extending forward), clothed with hair and reaching beyond the frons. Antennae of male ciliated. Abdomen and legs are long and slender. Hind tibia dilated with a fold containing a hair tuft. Forewings long and narrow, with round apex. Vein 3 from before angle of cell and veins 7 to 9 stalked from before upper angle. Vein 10 absent, whereas vein 11 anastomosing with vein 12 and then with veins 8 and 9. Hindwings with vein 3 from before angle of cell and vein 5 from just above middle of discocellulars. Veins 6 and 7 from upper angle.

Species
Ozola apparata (Prout, 1928) – from Sumatra, Java and Borneo
Ozola basisparsata (Walker, [1863]) – from Borneo, Engano, Palawan, and Philippines
Ozola biangulifera (Moore, 1888) – from Himalaya
Ozola concreta (Prout, 1931) – from Malaysia
Ozola defectata (Inoue, 1971) – from Japan
Ozola extersaria (Walker, 1861) – from India
Ozola edui (Sommerer, 1995) – from Sumatra, Singapore, and Borneo
Ozola exigua (Swinhoe, 1902) – from Queensland)
Ozola falcipennis (Moore, 1888) – from Himalaya, Peninsular Malaysia, and Borneo
Ozola hollowayi (Scoble & Sommerer, 1988) – from Sumatra, Nias, Borneo, Philippines, Sulawesi, Lesser Sundas, South Moluccas, New Guinea, Bismarck Islands, and Queensland
Ozola indefensa (Warren, 1899) – from New Guinea
Ozola inexcisata (Fryer, 1912) – from the Seychelles
Ozola intransilis (Prout, 1928) – from Sumatra and Java
Ozola impedita (Walker, 1861) – from Borneo
Ozola japonica (Prout, 1910) – from Japan
Ozola liwana (Sommerer, 1995) – from Sumatra and Borneo
Ozola macariata (Walker, [1863]) – from Moluccas and Sulawesi
Ozola microniaria (Walker, 1862) – from Sri Lanka
Ozola minor (Moore, 1888) – from Sri Lanka, India, Andamans, Sumatra, Borneo, Philippines, and Sulawesi
Ozola minuta (Wiltshire, 1990) – from Yemen and Saudi Arabia
Ozola niphoplaca (Meyrick, 1886) – from Solomons
Ozola occidentalis (Prout, 1916) – from Cameroon
Ozola pannosa (Holloway, 1976) – from Borneo and Sumatra
Ozola plana (Warren, 1894) – from the Loyalty islands
Ozola prouti (Holloway, 1976) – from Borneo
Ozola pulverulenta (Warren, 1897) – southern Africa
Ozola sinuicosta (Prout, 1910) – from Himalaya
Ozola submontana (Holloway, 1976) – from Borneo
Ozola spilotis (Meyrick, 1897) – from Java, Sumatra, and Sumbawa
Ozola turlini (Herbulot, 1985) – from Sundaland and Sulawesi

References

Desmobathrinae